The anococcygeal body (anococcygeal ligament, or anococcygeal raphe) is a fibrous median raphe in the floor of the pelvis, which extends between the coccyx and the margin of the anus. It is composed of fibers of the levator ani muscle that unite with the muscle of the opposite side, muscle fibres from external anal sphincter, and fibrous connective tissue.

The fibers of the levator ani pass downward and backward to the middle line of the floor of the pelvis; the most posterior are inserted into the side of the last two segments of the coccyx; those placed more anteriorly unite with the muscle of the opposite side, in the anococcygeal body.

See also
 Iliococcygeal raphe

References

External links
 Image at rsnajnls.org
 Coccyx pain, tailbone pain, coccydynia (Peer-reviewed medical chapter, available free online at eMedicine)

Musculoskeletal system